Klan Kosova is a Kosovan private television station based in Pristina, Kosovo, which was launched on 17 February 2009 as the Kosovan version of TV Klan. It is owned by KGO Media Investments Holding.

History 

Klan Kosova was founded in 2009 on the first anniversary of Kosovo's independence, under the ownership of Aleksandër Frangaj of TV Klan. It entered satellite frequencies in November 2009.

In 2015, Klan Kosova moved from its offices at Perandori Justinian Street in Pristina to the ex-Damper Factory (Fabrika e Amortizatorëve) in Kosovo Polje. This move came around the same as its transition to broadcasting HD.

The station has been subject to criticism against it and its parent company Artmotion in 2021, when it was pulled from major cable providers, and the broadcast rights were only sold back to them in the condition that they bought Artmotion's large bundle of channels with it. This raised concerns to the Independent Media Commission amid complaints from viewers, asserting that Klan Kosova was breaking its rules in its attempt to stomp competition.

Programmes 

Klan Kosova's programmes include a broad range of mostly live and pre-recorded shows, news editions, social and economic programs and entertainments (movies, sports, etc.)

News bulletins and reports 
These include mainly daily news about the political, economical, cultural, and social environment in Kosovo. The programs also provide information regarding the main events occurring in every part of the world.

Other programmes  
Big Brother VIP Kosova
Ora 7
Ora e Pasdites
Info Magazine
Minuta e Fundit
 Rubikon
 Edicioni Special
 Privé
 Sports Show
 Kultora
 Familja Ime
 Fakte
 Humbësi Fiton
 Doku N'Klan
 Pasion e Profesion

See also 
 Television in Kosovo
 List of radio stations in Kosovo

References

External links
Official website
YouTube channel

Television stations in Kosovo
Radio stations in Kosovo
Television channels and stations established in 2009